Koottukari or Koottu curry is a prominent dish in the "Sadhya" of Kerala, south India. It is a yellow curry featuring one or two vegetables such as banana and coconut, and has a hot and sweet taste.

Kootu curry is a thick curry made with vegetables and legumes. The vegetables that are added in this curry are yam, ash gourd, carrots, snake gourd, pumpkins and plantains. The legumes used are black chickpeas, Bengal gram. Kootu Curry is one of the most important dishes of Onam Sadhya Feast.

See also
 Sadhya
 Cuisine of Kerala

External links

Indian curries
Kerala cuisine